Andrew Pickens may refer to:

Andrew Pickens (congressman) (1739–1817), American revolutionary soldier and US Congressman, South Carolina
Andrew Pickens (governor) (1779–1838), War of 1812 and Governor of South Carolina
Andrew C. Pickens, US Navy admiral during World War II on